is a railway station on the Hokuriku Shinkansen, in Echizen, Fukui, Japan, to be operated by West Japan Railway Company (JR West). It is expected to open around spring 2024.

History 
The station's name is currently being used by Fukui Railway's Echizen-Takefu Station, however the Shinkansen station will inherit the name "Echizen-Takefu Station" while Fukui Railway's station will revert to "Takefu-Shin Station" (last changed in 2010).

Lines

Surrounding area
 Takefu Interchange, on the Hokuriku Expressway
 National Route 8
 Takefu Station (Hokuriku Main Line), approximately 5 km west
 Echizen-Takefu Station (Fukui Railway Fukubu Line), approximately 5 km west
 Echizen City Office
 Jin-ai University
 Fukui Prefectural Takefu Higashi Senior High School 
 Manyo Junior High School
 Kitahino Elementary School
 Kitashinjo Elementary School

See also
 List of railway stations in Japan

References

Railway stations in Fukui Prefecture
Hokuriku Shinkansen
Stations of West Japan Railway Company
Proposed railway stations in Japan
Echizen, Fukui
Railway stations scheduled to open in 2024